Patrick John Burke (born December 14, 1973) is an Irish former professional basketball player. Burke (whose family moved from Tullamore, Ireland, to Cleveland, Ohio, when he was three years old) competed in the National Basketball Association (NBA) and also played in Europe, ending his career with the Polish club Asseco Prokom Sopot.  He was a co-captain of the senior Irish national basketball team and also represented his country at the World University Games.

Early life 
Burke played high school basketball at Mariner High School in Cape Coral, Florida. He played college basketball at Auburn University with the Auburn Tigers from 1993 to 1997.

Professional career

NBA 
After not being drafted out of Auburn University in 1997, Burke became the first Irish-born player in NBA history when he signed a contract with the Orlando Magic in 2002. He played in 62 games with them, averaging 4.3 points and 2.4 rebounds per game. He did not play in the NBA during the 2003–04 NBA season, or the 2004–05 NBA season. In his return to the NBA, he played for the Phoenix Suns for two seasons. He was also in training camp with the Golden State Warriors in 2007 before being released.

Europe 
Burke was a EuroLeague champion with Panathinaikos in the 1999–00 season and he also helped the "Greens" to win three consecutive Greek League titles from 1999 to 2001. In Europe, he also played with the Spanish clubs Tau Ceramica, Gran Canaria and Real Madrid, and with Maroussi in Greece. He helped Real to the final of the ULEB Cup (now called EuroCup) in 2004 and to the Spanish League title in 2005.

In November 2007, Burke signed with Russian club Khimki and helped the team win their first Russian Cup title. Burke averaged 8.2 points and 5.2 rebounds per game in 211 career games played over all of the different European leagues that he competed in. In 2008, he moved to the Polish club Asseco Prokom Sopot and he helped the team to win the league's title.

References

External links 
Euroleague.net Profile
Pat Burke career stats and info
ACB.com Profile 

1973 births
Living people
Asseco Gdynia players
Auburn Tigers men's basketball players
BC Khimki players
CB Gran Canaria players
Centers (basketball)
Greek Basket League players
Ireland men's national basketball team players
Irish expatriate basketball people in Greece
Irish expatriate basketball people in Poland
Irish expatriate basketball people in Russia
Irish expatriate basketball people in Spain
Irish expatriate basketball people in the United States
Irish men's basketball players
Liga ACB players
Maroussi B.C. players
Orlando Magic players
Panathinaikos B.C. players
Phoenix Suns players
Real Madrid Baloncesto players
Saski Baskonia players
Sportspeople from County Dublin
Undrafted National Basketball Association players